Columbia metropolitan area or Greater Columbia can refer to:

Columbia metropolitan area (Missouri)
Columbia metropolitan area (South Carolina)